Neonitocris modesta is a species of beetle in the family Cerambycidae. It was described by Johan Christian Fabricius in 1781. It is known from Guinea.

References

modesta
Beetles described in 1781